Pandoflabella nigrilunalis is a species of snout moth in the genus Pandoflabella. It is found in Guyana.

References

Moths described in 1913
Epipaschiinae